Saint Petersburg Electrotechnical University "LETI" (ETU, ETU "LETI") is a public university and one of the oldest Russian higher education institutions.

It was founded in 1886 as a Technical College. LETI, as it is popularly called, received the status of a higher education institution in 1899 and became known as Electrotechnical Institute. The University has training programs in fields of radio engineering, telecommunications, control processes, computer engineering and IT, electronics, biomedical engineering, management, and linguistics. In August 2016 ETU “LETI” became the part of the Project 5-100, a Russian academic excellence program seeking to bring five Russian universities into the top 100 in world rankings.

In 2022, the university was ranked #701 in the world by QS World University Rankings, and #1,201 by Times Higher Education World University Rankings.

History
The need to establish a specialized educational institution focused on electrical engineering arose in Russia in 1884. At the time, application of electrical phenomena in telegraph devices was widespread, so the main task for the new Technical College was to teach subjects dealing only with the oldest branch of electrical engineering. The Chief of the Administration of Posts and Telegraphs made a statement about the need for specialists with higher education in the State Council of the Russian Empire. Count Dmitry Tolstoy, Minister of Interior, submitted a draft of Provisional Regulations to the State Council and the staff of the Technical College. On June 3, 1886, Emperor Alexander III approved of the Provisional Regulations on the Technical College with a three-year term of study.

On September 4, 1886, Technical College of the Postal and Telegraph Department, the first civilian electrotechnical educational Institution in Russia, was opened. Nikolai Pisarevsky, an engineer in the field of electrical communications, became the director of the school. The building of the former Telegraph Department (Novo-Isaakievskaya 18, now Yakubovicha Street) was allocated for the needs of the college.

The results of the first study year showed that it was necessary to increase the period of study and expand education programs. On June 11 (23), 1891, Emperor Alexander III signed a decree and renamed Technical College as Electrotechnical Institute (ETI) with a four-year term of study. Its graduates had the right to defend their thesis projects after one year of practical work, and they were awarded titles of engineers. The curriculum was expanded and departments were established on core subjects - mathematics, physics, chemistry, electrical engineering, telegraph and telegraph devices. Education was free.

After Pisarevsky passed away in 1895, Nikolai Kachalov became the head of the institute. In the days of his leadership, the university underwent changes. On June 4 (16), 1899, ETI was granted the status of a higher education institution with the introduction of a five-year training period. The university began specialist training in all fields of electrical studies. In August 1899, Emperor Nicholas II issued an order to rename the institute in memory of its "unforgettable founder", Alexander III as Electrotechnical Institute of Emperor Alexander III. Graduates have been awarded titles of electrical engineers since 1900.

The second industrial revolution in the late XIX century increased the demand for electrical engineering. It was decided to construct a group of buildings for the Institute on Aptekarsky Island. Architect Alexander Vekshinsky designed the building in pseudo-gothic style. The Institute was granted classrooms, as well as laboratories, a library, and an assembly hall. ETI moved to the new location in 1903. Alexander Popov, the inventor of the radio, was appointed as professor of the Department of Physics in 1901. He then became the first elected director of the institute in September 1905.

After the revolution 

Prof. Valentin Kovalenkov and Prof. Nikolai Scritsky introduced a new Telemechanics major. Later the Department of Automation and Telemechanics was founded as well. Valentin Vologdin founded a laboratory of high-frequency electrical engineering at LETI in 1935. The laboratory became a research institute of high-frequency currents in 1947.

During the Second World War, many academic and administrative staff members, as well as students of the Institute went off to the front. When Leningrad was besieged, a group of scientists led by Prof. Sergei Rinkevich remained there. In April 1942, Rinkevich helped establish the Research Bureau affiliated to the People's Commissariat of the Shipbuilding Industry that carried out special tasks to ensure the defense of Leningrad. Prof. A. Alekseev organized welding works on Lake Ladoga. He repaired metal parts of berths and vessels utilized on the Road of Life. A monument dedicated to students and employees of LETI who died in the Great Patriotic War was erected on Instrumentalnaya Street on November 5, 1986.

In 1992, the institute received the status of a Technical University. In 1998, the Ugra branch of ETU “LETI” (Yugorsk, Khanty-Mansi Autonomous Okrug) was opened.

Today 
Bachelors, masters, and specialists receive training at 7 full-time faculties.

ETU is preparing students in:

Bachelor's degree
 19 fields (43 educational programs) of full-time education;
 10 fields of part-time education;
 4 fields of extramural education.
Master's degree
 15 fields (53 educational programs) of full-time education, 6 of which in English.
Specialist degree
 2 specialties of full-time education (4 educational programs).

The European Association of ENAEE certified 46 educational programs.

Scientific personnel receive training in 43 scientific specialties. Currently, 234 graduate students are studying at ETU. The university has 9 dissertation councils in 23 scientific specialties. More than 50 people finish post-graduate study every year. About 9226 students and postgraduates are studying at ETU at the moment. The university has 3 full members and 5 corresponding members of the Russian Academy of Sciences, 20 laureates of national and international awards, more than 220 professors and doctors of science. University has more than 2,000 graduates on main educational programs annually.

Besides 350 academic laboratories of 7 faculties, research and innovation complex of the ETU includes Technology park, 8 research and educational centers, 3 resource centers, 5 research institutes, Youth Research Institute, and 14 basic departments at specialized enterprises of strategic partners. More than 100 high-tech enterprises of industries are strategic partners of ETU. 

Among foreign partners of the university are 19 large plant facilities, 15 science and research institutes and centers, 160 universities from 75 countries.

The university takes the 8th place among technical universities of Russia and the 2nd place among technical universities of St. Petersburg in the ranking of the demand for universities in Russia. In 2018, ETU took the 5th place among the technical universities of Russia and the 2nd place among the technical universities of St. Petersburg in monitoring the quality of admission to universities. ETU "LETI" takes the 1st place among technical universities of St. Petersburg on monitoring the employment of graduates.

Rankings

In 2022, the university was ranked #701 in the world by QS World University Rankings, and #1,201 by Times Higher Education World University Rankings.

Studies for foreigners

ETU “LETI” specializes in electrical engineering, radio engineering, and computer science, but also offers Bachelor's, Master's and Doctoral programs in the field of humanities, economics and public relations. ETU “LETI” welcomes students all over the world. There are about 1000 international students from 60 countries at the university.

International students who are willing to acquire new knowledge and practical skills can apply to each of the 6 English-taught Master's programs at the university:

Laser Measuring Technology
Bioengineering Systems and Technologies for Prosthetics and Rehabilitation
RF, Microwave and Terahertz Engineering of Wireless Systems
Automation and Mechatronics
Photovoltaics and Solar Energy Technology
Efficient Electric Power Industry
Computer Science and Knowledge Discovery

Other programs require Russian language comprehension. However, international students can get enrolled in the Preparatory Department to bridge this gap. For those who want to learn Russian, ETU LETI offers Summer Schools of Russian language. In addition to that, university organizes Professional Summer Schools that provide students with an opportunity to acquire additional skills and increase their knowledge in the following areas:
Biomedical Engineering
Software Engineering

International cooperation
ETU LETI has partnership cooperation in education with 82 universities in 29 countries. It takes part in Erasmus Mundus program.

University offers several Joint and Double-diploma programs such as Joint bachelor's program with Xuzhou Institute of Technology, Double-diploma program with Lappeenranta University of Technology and TU Ilmenau.

Names
1886-1891 – Technical College of the Post and Telegraph Department

1891-1898 – Electrotechnical Institute

1898-1917 – Electrotechnical Institute of Emperor Alexander III

1918-1992 – Electrotechnical Institute named after V.I. Ulyanov (Lenin)

1992-1998 – Saint Petersburg Electrotechnical University

Since 1998 – Saint Petersburg Electrotechnical University "LETI"

Official names
Saint Petersburg Electrotechnical University "LETI"
ETU
Санкт-Петербургский государственный электротехнический университет «ЛЭТИ» им. В.И. Ульянова (Ленина)
СПбГЭТУ «ЛЭТИ»

Famous alumni
Zhores Alferov, physicist and academic, shared the 2000 Nobel Prize in Physics for the development of the semiconductor heterojunction for optoelectronics, politician
Dmitry Astrakhan, film director and actor
Valery Golubev, politician and businessman
Konstantin Khrenov, engineer and inventor
Vladimir Kozhin, politician and businessman
Alexander Borisovich Mindlin, engineer and author
Alexei Mishin, pair skater and figure skating coach
Peter Mostovoy, Russian-Israeli filmmaker

References

External links

 

Universities in Saint Petersburg
1886 establishments in the Russian Empire
Educational institutions established in 1886
Technical universities and colleges in Russia
Cultural heritage monuments of regional significance in Saint Petersburg